is an amateur Japanese Greco-Roman wrestler, who competed in the men's heavyweight category. He won a silver medal for the 84 kg division at the 2010 Asian Wrestling Championships in Delhi, India, losing out to South Korea's Lee Se-Yeol. Saikawa is also a member of Ryomo Yakult Wrestling Club, and is coached and trained by former Asian Games light heavyweight champion and two-time Olympian Shingo Matsumoto.

Saikawa represented Japan at the 2012 Summer Olympics in London, where he competed for the men's 96 kg class. He received a bye for the preliminary round of sixteen match, before losing out to Sweden's Jimmy Lidberg, who was able to score three points in two straight periods, leaving Saikawa without a single point.

References

External links
Profile – International Wrestling Database
NBC Olympics Profile

1986 births
Living people
Olympic wrestlers of Japan
Wrestlers at the 2012 Summer Olympics
Wrestlers at the 2010 Asian Games
Sportspeople from Tochigi Prefecture
Wrestlers at the 2014 Asian Games
Asian Games medalists in wrestling
Japanese male sport wrestlers
Asian Games bronze medalists for Japan
Medalists at the 2014 Asian Games
21st-century Japanese people
Asian Wrestling Championships medalists